Catholic law may refer to:

 Catholic Law, the law school of The Catholic University of America in Washington, D.C.
 Canon law of the Catholic Church

See also
 :Category:Catholic law schools in the United States